Clostridium paraputrificum is an anaerobic, motile, gram-positive bacterium.

References

External links
 
 Type strain of Clostridium paraputrificum at BacDive -  the Bacterial Diversity Metadatabase

Gram-positive bacteria
Bacteria described in 1936
paraputrificum